The Aircraft Carrier Alliance is a partnership of BAE Systems, Babcock International, Thales Group and the Ministry of Defence (which acts as both partner and client), together with Rosyth Dockyard, to build the s for the Royal Navy. Along with Rosyth and BAE Systems' Govan yard, four other shipyards involved in the build process are A&P Tyne, Appledore Shipbuilders, Cammell Laird and HMNB Portsmouth.

References

External links 
 

Shipbuilding companies of the United Kingdom